T'illu (Quechua for pinch, tweaking, Hispanicized spellings Tello, Tillo) is a mountain in the Andes of Peru, about  high. It is situated in the northern part of the main sector of the Waytapallana mountain range. It lies in the Junín Region, Concepción Province, Comas District.

References 

Mountains of Peru
Mountains of Junín Region